Rachesa is a genus of moths in the family Saturniidae first described by Charles Duncan Michener in 1949.

Species
Rachesa adusta (W. Rothschild, 1907)
Rachesa alegrensis Brechlin & Meister, 2011
Rachesa breteuili (Bouvier, 1927)
Rachesa chrisbrechlinae Brechlin & Meister, 2011
Rachesa lampei Brechlin & Meister, 2011
Rachesa nisa (Druce, 1904)
Rachesa reventador Lemaire, 1975
Rachesa sinjaevorum Brechlin & Meister, 2011
Rachesa viksinjaevi Brechlin & Meister, 2011

References

Ceratocampinae